Bryopteris is a genus of liverworts in family Lejeuneaceae. It contains the following species (but this list may be incomplete):
 Bryopteris gaudichaudii Gottsche

References 

Porellales genera
Lejeuneaceae
Taxonomy articles created by Polbot